Babruvahana is a 1977 Indian Kannada-language Hindu mythological film directed by Hunsur Krishnamurthy . The film stars Rajkumar in a dual role as Arjuna and his son Babruvahana, the titular character alongside an ensemble supporting cast that includes B. Saroja Devi, Kanchana, Jayamala, Vajramuni, Thoogudeepa Srinivas and Ramakrishna.

The film narrates the story of Babruvahana, the son of Arjuna and Chitrangada, and the events that lead to him waging a war against his own father so as to restore his mother's honour. This was the first Kannada movie and seventh Indian movie to be based on Babruvahana.

The film won two awards at the 1976–77 Karnataka State Film Awards — Best Actor (Rajkumar) and Best Sound Recording (S. P. Ramanathan). The movie saw a theatrical run of 25 weeks. The movie was dubbed in Telugu in 1979 as Arjuna Garvabhangam. It was also dubbed in Hindi as Veer Arjun in 1977. This was the second instance of him portraying the role of Arjuna's son - the first when he portrayed the role of Iravan in the 1961 movie Nagarjuna. With this, he became the only actor to portray the role of Arjuna and his two sons.

Plot 
The story starts at Indraprasta where Pandavas are ruling after the partition of Hastinapura. On one occasion Arjuna accidentally breaches privacy of his elder brother Yudhistira and Draupadi when they are together. To repent for this he decides to go on Vanavasa. While in the Manipura kingdom he impresses the princess Chitrangada by hunting a Tiger by Shabdavedhi (non-visual archery). The princess falls for Arjuna and accepts him as her husband.

While bathing in river Arjuna is abducted by Uluchi, the princess of Nagaloka. She admits her feelings for Arjuna and they marry in Gandharva vivaha. Krishna uses his magical powers to bring Arjuna back from Nagaloka. He meets up with Chitrangada and they marry in Gandharva vivaha giving birth to a son, Babruvahana.

Krishna, with the help of Ghatotkacha brings back Arjuna from Manipura and wipes his memory of both the wives - Chitrangada and Uluchi. He says his sister, Subhadra is eligible for marriage and Balarama wishes Duryodhana to be married to her. With the help of Krishna, Arjuna disguises himself as a sanyasi and elopes with Subhadra.

Years pass by and the Pandavas are victorious in Mahabharata war. They organise Ashwamedha yaga to establish sovereignty over the subcontinent. Arjuna spearheads the campaign along with Karna's son, Vrishaketu and conquers kingdoms after kingdom. The scorned queen of one of the defeated kings vows revenge on Arjuna and forces Ganga to curse Arjuna for killing the latter's son Bhishma. Ganga curses Arjuna that he will die at the hands of his own son.

Babruvahana has grown up to become the ruler of Manipura kingdom and surpasses his father Arjuna in archery. Pandavas' Ashwamedha horse enters the kingdom of Manipura. Babruvahana must either accept sovereignty of Pandavas over the region and pay a tribute or defeat Arjuna in battle. Upon learning from his mother that Arjuna is his biological father, Babruvahana goes to Pandavas' camp to offer his submission and to accept Arjuna as his father. Arjuna, who cannot remember Chitrangada insults Babruvahana by calling his mother a woman of loose morals.

Thus the battleground is set for a clash between the forces of Arjuna and Babruvahana. On the first and second days of the battle Babruvahana holds off Arjuna's forces with ease and kills Vrishaketu. On the third day, Arjuna and Babruvahana meet face to face on the battlefield. Chitrangada serves as charioteer of Arjuna whereas Uluchi becomes charioteer of Babruvahana. Babruvahana kills Arjuna and effectively ends their Ashwamedha Yaga. Uluchi reveals herself to be Ganga in disguise who was there to witness her curse reap fruits. Uluchi advises Babruvahana to revive Arjuna using Sanjeevani-mani from Nagaloka.

As Chitrangada is lamenting over Arjuna's death, Takshak decapitates Arjuna's corpse and take his head to Nagaloka. Krishna with the help of his Sudharshan Chakra defeats Takshak's henchmen and brings back the severed head of Arjuna. Using the Sanjeevani-mani which Babruvahana got from Nagaloka, Arjuna is revived. Lord Krishna then revives all the soldiers who died in the battle. Arjuna unites with his wife Chitrangada and accepts Babruvahana as his son.

Cast

Soundtrack 
The music of the film was composed by T. G. Lingappa with lyrics for the soundtrack penned by Chi. Udaya Shankar and Hunsur Krishnamurthy.

Track list

Release 
The film received a U Certificate from the Censor Board's regional office at Chennai, the certificate dated 17 January 1977. The film was released on 16 February 1977 to positive reviews.

Box office 
The film had a phenomenal run of 175 days in several centres across Karnataka. The film had a 100 days run in Chennai while the Telugu dubbed version also completed a 100 days run in Andhra Pradesh.

Awards 
1976–77 Karnataka State Film Awards
 Best Actor — Rajkumar
 Best Sound Recording — S. P. Ramanathan

Citations

Notes

External links 
 

1977 films
1970s Kannada-language films
Films scored by T. G. Lingappa
Films based on the Mahabharata